The 2019 Rally Estonia (formally known as the Shell Helix Rally Estonia 2019) was a motor racing event for rally cars that was held over three days between 12 and 14 July 2019. It marked the ninth running of Rally Estonia. The event consisted of fifteen special stages totalling  in competitive kilometres. The stages were run on smooth gravel roads of Southern Estonia. Two street stages were also held during the rally, in Tartu and in Elva. Rally headquarters and service park were based in Otepää, at the Tehvandi Sports Center, while city of Tartu hosted the ceremonial start and finish. 

The 2019 edition was the first ever Official WRC Promotional Event with all the current WRC works teams (Toyota, M-Sport, Hyundai and Citroën) featured in the line-up. Ott Tänak & Martin Järveoja repeated last year's win, this time ahead of Andreas Mikkelsen & Anders Jæger-Amland. Esapekka Lappi & Janne Ferm completed the podium.

Background

Entry list

Report

Classification

Special stages

References

External links
 The official website of Rally Estonia

Rally Estonia
Estonia
Rally Estonia
Rally Estonia